Alexander Angus "Tando" MacIsaac (July 18, 1907 – October 29, 1968) was a Nova Scotia politician and Member of the Legislature for Guysborough.

MacIsaac was first elected in the June 7, 1960, general election with a 189-vote margin. He was re-elected in the October 8, 1963, general election by 394 votes, and again in the May 30, 1967, general election by 329 votes.

MacIsaac died on October 29, 1968, as a result of a motor vehicle accident.   In the subsequent by-election, his son Angus MacIsaac ran and was elected to the Nova Scotia House of Assembly.

References

1907 births
1968 deaths
Progressive Conservative Association of Nova Scotia MLAs
People from Guysborough County, Nova Scotia